The 2017 Texas–Arlington Mavericks baseball team represented the University of Texas at Arlington in the 2017 NCAA Division I baseball season. The Mavericks played their home games at Clay Gould Ballpark.

Schedule and results
Texas–Arlington Mavericks announced its 2017 baseball schedule on November 4, 2016. The 2017 schedule consisted of 26 home and 29 away games in the regular season. The Mavericks hosted Sun Belts foes Coastal Carolina, Georgia Southern, Little Rock, Louisiana, and Troy and will travel to Appalachian State, Arkansas State, Georgia State, Louisiana–Monroe, and Texas State.

The 2017 Sun Belt Conference Championship was contested May 24–28 in Statesboro, Georgia, and was hosted by Georgia Southern.

Texas-Arlington finished 1st in the west division of the conference which qualified the Mavericks to compete in the tournament as the 2nd seed  seeking for the team's 1st Sun Belt Conference tournament title.

 Rankings are based on the team's current  ranking in the Collegiate Baseball poll.

References

Texas-Arlington
UT Arlington Mavericks baseball seasons